Karisma Kapoor is an Indian actress widely known for her work in Hindi films. Kapoor made her acting debut at the age of seventeen with the romance Prem Qaidi in 1991, which was a box office hit. She then appeared in successful ventures, drama Sapne Sajan Ke (1992), and action drama Jigar (1992). Kapoor had her first commercial success in a leading role in romantic action drama Anari (1993), which was a moderate success and was one of the highest-grossing Hindi films of 1993. Between 19931996 she featured in several highly successful films, including the comedy drama Raja Babu (1994), action drama Suhaag (1994), action comedy Andaz (1994),  the comedies Coolie No. 1 (1995), Saajan Chale Sasural (1996), and Hero No. 1 (1997), and the action thriller Jeet (1996). The success of these films marked a turning point in her career, establishing Kapoor as a leading actress in Hindi cinema.

Kapoor's career prospects improved in 1996 when Dharmesh Darshan cast her in his romantic drama Raja Hindustani. The film earned her praise from critics, and Kapoor won her first Filmfare Award for Best Actress. The following year, she received widespread recognition as well as the National Film Award and Filmfare Award for Best Supporting Actress for portraying a headstrong dancer in Dil To Pagal Hai, a musical romantic drama produced by Yash Raj Films. Subsequently, she played leading roles in several blockbuster films, including the comedies Biwi No.1 (1999), the ensemble family drama Hum Saath-Saath Hain (1999), and the romantic comedy Dulhan Hum Le Jayenge (2000). Her acclaimed performance of a disillusioned sister of Hrithik Roshan's character in the crime drama Fiza (2000) which earned her a second Best Actress award at Filmfare. The following year, she portrayed actress Zubeida Begum in the biographical drama Zubeidaa (2001), won her a Filmfare Award for Best Actress (Critics). In 2002, she portrayed a troubled daughter-in-law in the revenge-seeking war drama Shakti: The Power.

In 2003, Kapoor married businessman Sanjay Kapur and took a sabbatical from the films. However, she appeared in Sahara One's television series Karishma – The Miracles of Destiny (2003–2004) and judged various reality shows, including the celebrity dance show Nach Baliye (2008–2009), during this time. In 2011, she provided her voice for the role of Chhaya in the action thriller Bodyguard, which broke many records upon its release. It became the highest opening day grosser, collecting  in its first week, thus becoming the highest opening week grossing. She made her acting comeback to films with the period drama Dangerous Ishhq (2012) in which she played four different characters, belonging to four different past lives. It proved to be a commercial failure yet earned Kapoor appreciation for her performance. After the release of Dangerous Ishhq, she again took a sabbatical from films. In 2020, she played a mother in the web series Mentalhood.

Films

Television

Web series

See also
 List of awards and nominations received by Karisma Kapoor

Footnotes

References

Further reading
 

Indian filmographies
Actress filmographies